Flaxen generally describes things that are made of flax, or have the color of unspun dressed flax — a pale yellowish-gray. Uses include:

Flaxen, a variant of the blonde human hair color
Flaxen gene, a gene that causes light-colored manes and tails in chestnut-colored horses
Flaxen elimia, a common name for a variety of Pleurocera catenaria, a species of freshwater snail

See also
Flax
Flax (disambiguation)